Jilotepec may refer to:
 the municipality of Jilotepec (municipality), State of Mexico, or its municipal seat Jilotepec de Molina Enríquez
 the municipality of Jilotepec, Veracruz, or its municipal seat of the same name